Group C was one of four groups of nations competing at the 2011 AFC Asian Cup. The group's first round of matches were played on 10 January and its last matches were played on 18 January. All six group matches were played at venues in Doha, Qatar. The group consisted of Australia, South Korea, 2008 AFC Challenge Cup champions India and Bahrain.

Standings

All times are UTC+3.

India vs Australia

Korea Republic vs Bahrain

Australia vs Korea Republic

Bahrain vs India

Korea Republic vs India

Australia vs Bahrain

Notes

External links
AFC Asian Cup 2011 Official Site

Group
Group
2010–11 in Indian football
2010–11 in Bahraini football
2011 in South Korean football